Abby Dobson (born 1969) is an Australian singer and musician. Dobson was the lead vocalist for the pop band Leonardo's Bride.

In 2002, Dobson recorded the song "Don't Ask For More" for The Secret Life of Us volume 2 soundtrack compilation album released through Liberation Music. The following year, Dobson contributed the song "I'm Not Missing You" to The Secret Life of Us volume 3 soundtrack album.

Dobson has collaborated with musician Paul Mac on several tracks, including "Gonna Miss You" and "Above the Clouds" from the 2001 album 3000 Feet High and "The Beginning of the End Of Time" from the 2005 album Panic Room.

She appeared on i98fm with Lachlan Kitchen as part of the No. 1 rating morning show for the Illawarra and south coast of NSW. She also appeared on Australian television channel 31's music criticism program, Dancing About Architecture, in March 2009.

In 2013, Dobson auditioned for Season 2 of The Voice (Australia) but was unsuccessful.

Dobson has released two solo studio albums: Rise Up (2007) and It's Okay, Sweetheart (October 2018).

Discography

Albums

Singles

Other appearances

References

External links
Abby Dobson official site
Craving Records biography of Abby Dobson
Abby Dobson on Dancing About Architecture, Episode Three

1969 births
Australian women singer-songwriters
Living people